Next Top Model by Cătălin Botezatu is a Romanian reality television show based on Tyra Banks' America's Next Top Model. It pits aspiring models against each other in a variety of tests to determine who will win title of Romania's Next Top Model along with a lucrative 4-year-long modelling contract with MRA Models worth 50,000 Euros.

All three seasons of the competition were hosted by Romanian fashion designer Cătălin Botezatu, making him the fifth male host of the Top Model franchise after Fyodor Bondarchuk, Alexander Tsekalo (both Russia), Jay Manuel (Canada) and Nathan Lee (Vietnam, later replaced by Hà Anh). The panel is completed by photographer Gabriel Hennessey, makeup artist Mirela Vascan, hair stylist Laurent Tourette and model agent Livio Ionescu.

Show format

Challenges
Each episode usually begins with the contestants receiving training in an area concurrent with the week's theme. For example, contestants may get coached in runway walking, improvisational acting, or applying makeup to suit various occasions. A related challenge soon follows, such as a mock (or real) runway show or interview, and a winner is chosen by a judge. She receives some prize, such as clothing, a night out, or an advantage at the next photo shoot. The winning contestant may gain immunity from elimination at the next judging.

Photo shoots
The next segment is usually a photo shoot, which may involve beauty shots, posing in swimwear, lingerie or other clothing, posing nude or semi-nude, posing with a male model, or posing with animals among other themes. Performance in each week's photo shoot typically weighs heavily in the final judging, and it can result in the elimination of one or more contestants.

Judging
The final segment of each episode involves judging by a panel of fashion industry experts. Each contestant's photo, or video performance, is then shown and evaluated by the panel. After all photos have been evaluated, the contestants leave the room and the judges deliberate.

The elimination process follows a rigid format. The host reveals, one by one and in order of merit, the photos of the contestants who have not been eliminated. The last two, three, or four contestants who have not received their photos are brought forward for special critiques by the host before the final photo(s) is/are revealed. The contestants who have not received a photo are thus eliminated from the competition.

International destinations
In contrast to the American version of Next Top Model where a trip to an international destination is usually scheduled at about two-thirds of the way through the competition, Romania's Next Top Model  is non-committal about traveling. The first season traveled abroad four times, and the second and third seasons traveled a total of three times.

Seasons
Season 1 began airing on February 3, 2011, on Antena 1, and was eventually won by 16-year-old Emma Dumitrescu. The season saw controversy when Lucia Popa was disqualified after physically attacking Dumitrescu. Castings for season 2 were held in the spring of 2011, and season 2 began airing on September 15, 2011. Laura Giurcanu ultimately won the competition. Season 3 began airing on September 20, 2012, and was eventually won by Ramona Popescu.

See also
Supermodels (Romanian TV series)

References

Romania
2011 Romanian television series debuts
Antena 1 (Romania) original programming
Romanian reality television series
Romanian television series based on American television series